Trémuson is a commune in the Côtes-d'Armor department of Brittany in northwestern France.

Population

Inhabitants of Trémuson are called trémusonnais in French.

See also
Communes of the Côtes-d'Armor department

References

Communes of Côtes-d'Armor